Gunnar Tycho Langhof Andersen (12 May 1911 – 13 November 1981) was a Danish cyclist. He competed in the individual road race event at the 1932 Summer Olympics.

References

External links
 

1911 births
1981 deaths
Danish male cyclists
Olympic cyclists of Denmark
Cyclists at the 1932 Summer Olympics
Cyclists from Copenhagen